Protasevich or Pratasevich (Belarusian: Пратасевіч) is a gender-neutral Belarusian surname that may refer to the following notable people:
Mikhail Protasevich (born 1971), Belarusian sailor
Roman Protasevich (born 1995), Belarusian journalist and opposition activist

See also
 
 Protas
 Mark Protosevich (born 1961), American screenwriter

Belarusian-language surnames